Dragizhevo is a village in Northern Bulgaria. The village is located in Lyaskovets Municipality, Veliko Tarnovo Province. Аccording to the numbers counted by the 2020 Bulgarian census, Dragizhevo currently has a population of 921 people with a permanent address registration in the settlement.

Geography 
Dragizhevo village is located in Northern Bulgaria, 11 kilometers away southeast from Veliko Tarnovo, and 4 kilometers away from Lyaskovets.

The elevation in the village varies between 200 and 299 meters with an average of 210 meters.

The climate conditions in the village are continental, with a cold winter and a warm summer, making it a good place for agriculture and animal husbandry.

History and Culture 
The initial establishment of the settlement began with the merger of four or six smaller villages - Batley, Dzhurovets, Fashkovets, and Sharkovets.

Buildings 

 In 1894, the village built its current library and community hall “Razvitie”. 
 Half a kilometer away from the village, the Medieval Ottoman Stronghold Gradishte’s remains can be found.
 In 1888, the high school “Kiril i Metodii” was built. The first headmaster was Atanas Dachov.
 The church was built in 1837. “Sv Konstantin i Elena”

Ethnicity 
According to the Bulgarian population census in 2011.

References 

Villages in Veliko Tarnovo Province